John Tripp may refer to:

John Tripp (poet), Anglo-Welsh poet and story writer
John Tripp (ice hockey), professional ice hockey player
Jack Tripp, British actor

See also
John Trippe, naval commander